Mesocnemis singularis is a species of damselfly in the family Platycnemididae. Common names include riverjack, savanna riverjack, common riverjack, savanna brook-damsel, and savanna stream-damsel.

Distribution
This species is widespread in sub-Saharan Africa; it has been found in Angola, Botswana, Cameroon, the Democratic Republic of the Congo, Ivory Coast, Gabon, Ghana, Guinea, Kenya, Liberia, Malawi, Mozambique, Namibia, Nigeria, Sierra Leone, South Africa, Sudan, Tanzania, Togo, Uganda, Zambia, and Zimbabwe.

Habitat
Its natural habitats include open, rocky rivers and streams in savanna, bush or forest; also rocky shores of lakes.

Identification

References

Platycnemididae
Insects described in 1891
Taxonomy articles created by Polbot